Fichtenau is a community of several villages, in the district of Schwäbisch Hall, in Baden-Württemberg, Germany.

References

Schwäbisch Hall (district)
Württemberg